Asghar Qadir ( born 23 July 1946) HI, SI, FPAS, is a Pakistani mathematician and a prominent cosmologist, specialised in mathematical physics and physical cosmology. 
He has mentored several graduate students throughout his career and also served on important administrative positions, which include being the Chairman of the Mathematics Department at Quaid-i-Azam University, Islamabad, and later the Dean of Faculty of Natural Sciences at the same university. Professor Qadir formed the Center for Advanced Mathematics & Physics at the National University of Science and Technology, in 2004, served as its founding Director General until 2011 and as Professor Emeritus until 2019.
He is considered one of the top mathematicians in Pakistan. He is currently working as a visiting professor at Abdus Salam School of Mathematical Sciences, Government College University, Lahore.

He is a distinguished student of English mathematical physicist Roger Penrose. He has published numerous papers in the fields of Mathematical physics, Cosmology and Mathematics. Qadir has made important and significant contributions to the fields of differential equations, theoretical cosmology and mathematical physics. He has written and edited a number of books, mainly focusing on mathematical sciences and mathematical physics.

Qadir is author of the book "Relativity: An Introduction to the Special Theory" which has been translated in several different languages and is widely read by science students in colleges throughout Asia. He has attended more than 100 International and National Conferences and Seminars in the fields of Mathematics, Physics, Economics and the History and Philosophy of Science. He has published more than 250 research papers. He is the author of 12 books, 22 research level articles, 7 teaching journal papers, 32 popular articles, and 48 research preprints. He is noted for his work in mathematics and mathematical physics, in particular his contributions to general relativity and cosmology.

Asghar Qadir comes from a family whose members played important role in the formative years of Pakistan. His father, Manzur Qadir was a Pakistani jurist in 1960s and served as foreign minister in President Ayub Khan’s cabinet from 1958 to 1962. Asghar is also the grandson of Sir Abdul Qadir. His maternal grandfather, Sir Mian Fazl-i-Hussain was a notable politician from Punjab and founder of the Unionist Party (Punjab). His mother, Asghari, was the daughter of Sir Mian Fazl-i-Hussain.

Early life and education
Asghar Qadir was born in Simla (now Shimla) of British Indian Empire in 1946 to a middle-class family. After the independence of Pakistan in 1947, Qadir's family migrated to Lahore, West Pakistan, where they were settled in a house provided by the Government of Pakistan. In 1963, Qadir travelled to United Kingdom on a Commonwealth scholarship which he applied and qualified for. In 1963, Qadir attended the University of London and received his BSc(Hons) in Mathematics.

The same year, he became an A.R.S.C and also obtained his BS in Physics and DIC in Mathematics. In 1969, Qadir pursued his MSc in Mathematics, followed by PhD in Mathematical Physics and Theory of relativity with the specialisation in Twistor theory, under the supervision of Roger Penrose in 1971. He pioneered the mathematical contributions to the development of Special relativity and the twistor theory, which is the approach to the problems of fundamental physics pioneered by Roger Penrose.

Research and Career
Asghar was at University of Texas at Austin as a Fulbright Visiting Scholar during 1978/79 and 1986/87. In these  periods he worked with John Archibald Wheeler on Black Holes.

Rutherford High Energy Laboratory
Qadir became a research associate and fellow at the Rutherford High Energy Laboratory (it is now known as Rutherford Appleton Laboratory (RAL)) where he continued his research in the field of advanced computational mathematics. There, he worked in a complex mathematical applications arise in the theory of nuclear fission at the ISIS neutron source – a neutron scattering facility that mathematically studies the structure and behaviour of nuclear materials in a fission process. However, in early 1971, he came back to Pakistan and joined Quaid-e-Azam University as a research associate. In 1982, he became associate professor and then subsequently became a chairman of the department of mathematics in 1986.

Academic career
While in Pakistan, in the midst of the Indo-Pak War of 1971, Qadir was serving as a senior research associate at the University of Islamabad. After the Multan meeting, held on 20 January 1972, Qadir's colleagues and peers had quietly disappeared from campus. Qadir's close friend Riazuddin invited by him to Nilore to continue and carry out his advanced research at the Pakistan Atomic Energy Commission (PAEC). As an eminent and noted mathematician, Qadir was given the task to calculate critical mass and the physics cross-section calculations. Qadir, at first, adopted the Monte Carlo method for evaluating complicated mathematical integrals that arise in the theory of nuclear chain reactions. The mathematical calculations were brought up to Riazuddin, but Riazuddin already adopted the method earlier. Despite Riazuddin's and his calculations, Qadir then approached a better method to develop the fission device.

He then suggested adopting the Metropolis–Hastings algorithm using the Monte Carlo integration that arises in the theory of nuclear fusion and thermonuclear fission that can improve the intensity and frequency of the highly compressed shock waves, using the uranium reflector in a nuclear device. Then, Qadir opted the Pati–Salam model for solving the fission problem and suggested that the Salam's model can be used to develop an effective boosted fissionable reflector in a device. Qadir then continued to develop mathematical models and to evaluate critical mass problems. Riazuddin introduced Qadir to Salam where Salam encourages Qadir to research in mathematical physics in more depth. Under Riazuddin and Salam, Qadir specialized in the theory of Special relativity, mathematics of particle physics, and mathematical economics including quantum economics.

In 1976, Qadir joined Quaid-e-Azam University's Department of Mathematics as an associate professor. In 1983, Qadir became chairman of the Department of Mathematics at the Quaid-i-Azam University. In 1986, Riazuddin invited Qadir to Trieste, Italy to join International Centre for Theoretical Physics (ICTP) where he carried out his research in special and general theory of relativity. At ICTP, he taught the advanced course of differential equations, Special functions, Upper and lower bounds on Entropy and the Number Theory. In 1988, after researching at ICTP under Abdus Salam, Qadir re-joined Qau and became full professor of Mathematics.

In 1989, Qadir published a book on Special relativity through World Scientific. Qadir provided simple representation of details of calculations and its extension into theory of motion. Through his text book, Qadir briefly discussed and introduced the Special Relativity for extension into General Relativity.
  
In 1993, he was asked by the President, Ghulam Ishaq Khan (late), to teach in the then newly founded research institute at Topi, Ghulam Ishaq Khan Institute of Engineering Sciences and Technology. In 1994, he went to Saudi Arabia where he visited his lifelong friend Riazuddin where, on his friend's recommendation, joined King Fahd University of Petroleum and Minerals where he served as a chairman of Department of Mathematics and Statistics.

In 1998, Qadir came back to Pakistan and re-joined Quaid-e-Azam University as an associate professor of mathematics. The same year, Qadir joined the PAEC and became director-general of the Mathematical Physics Group where he was instrumental for leading the mathematical studies in the foundation of mathematical physics. Qadir became involved in a team preparing the nuclear device in Chagai and eye-witnessed the country's first nuclear tests (See Chagai-I and Chagai-II) where he was the director of the team leading the mathematical calculations to determine the yield. As part of his contribution, the Government of Pakistan conferred Qadir with civilian award, Sitara-e-Imtiaz, and earned the national fame. In 1999, Qadir became the Dean of Faculty of Natural Sciences which he continued till 2000. He served as the Founder Director General of the Centre for Advanced Mathematics and Physics (CAMP) (now School of Natural Sciences), National University of Sciences and Technology (NUST) from 2004 to 2011. He retired from NUST in 2019, and is currently affiliated with Abdus Salam School of Mathematics Sciences, GCU Lahore.

Awards and honours
Hilal-i-Imtiaz, Government of Pakistan (2008)
(First) Distinguished National Professor , HEC Pakistan (2004) (for life)
 ISESCO Award for Mathematics (2003)
 Sitara-i-Imtiaz, Government of Pakistan (1999)
 Gold Medal, Pakistan Academy of Sciences (1996)
 Al Khwarizmi First Prize for Mathematics, by Government of Iran (1995)
 Prize, National Book Council of Pakistan, (1991)
 Senior Fulbright Fellowship, University of Texas at Austin, Texas, USA, (1986-87)
 Fulbright Hayes Award (1978-79)
 First prize in General Knowledge Contest for High School Students (1961);

Fellowships and memberships
 Senior research fellow at Pakistan Institute of Development Economics (PIDE), from 1980 to 1994
 Joint secretary at Al-Kindi Society for the Advancement of the Philosophy of Science, Islamabad, Pakistan, (1980)
Associate member and senior associate of the International Centre for Theoretical Physics, Trieste, Italy, 1980–1999
 Life member and vice-president, Albert Einstein Society (Pakistan Chapter) (1985 to date)
 Life member, joint secretary and secretary, Pakistan Physical Society. (1992 and 1993)
 Life member and president, Fulbright Alumni Association, (1992–1993)

Publications
His recent newspaper articles include:
 Two Beacons of light (2017)
 Why the compulsory study of Islamiyat and Pakistan Studies is dividing us (2016)
 Don’t take too much notice of university rankings, they’re flawed (2016)
Did Malala deserve the Nobel Peace Prize? (2014) 
 Remembering Uncle Khushwant (2014) 
His academic books include:
 Topology for Beginners (with Noor Muhammad and Imran Parvez Khan) (2022) 
 Einstein's General Theory of Relativity (2020) 
 Relativity: An Introduction to the Special Theory (1989) 
His other publications include
 Popular Science: Fictional and Non-Fictional Dimensions 
 Riazuddin: In Memoriam (2014) 
International Symposium on Experimental Gravitation (1994) by Munawar Karim and Asghar Qadir
5th International Summer College on Physics and Contemporary Needs (1990)
 12th Regional Conference On Mathematical Physics (2008) by Aslam, M Jamil, Hussain, Faheem, Qadir, Asghar
 Gravitational Wave Sources May Be "Further" Than We Think by Asghar Qadir
 On Quantum Effects Near a Black Hole Singularity (2008) by Asghar Qadir, Asghar, Azad A. Siddiqui
 Mathematical physics: proceedings of the 12th Regional Conference by Riazuddin, Asghar Qadir, Faheem Hussain, Hamid Saleem, M. Jamil Aslam.

See also
 Roger Penrose
 Riazuddin
 Oliver Penrose
 Partial Differential Equation
 University of Islamabad
 National University of Sciences and Technology
 Muhammad Sharif
Ismat Beg

References

External links
 MIT Page of Asghar Qadir
 Pakistan Academy of Sciences page on Professor Asghar Qadir
 Pakistan Mathematical Society

1946 births
Pakistani Muslims
Project-706
Pakistani relativity theorists
Academics of Imperial College London
Alumni of the University of London
PDE theorists
Living people
Muhajir people
Pakistani textbook writers
Space and Upper Atmosphere Research Commission people
Monte Carlo methodologists
Fellows of Pakistan Academy of Sciences
Scientists from Lahore
Academic staff of Ghulam Ishaq Khan Institute of Engineering Sciences and Technology
21st-century Pakistani mathematicians
20th-century Pakistani mathematicians
Pakistani cosmologists
Academic staff of the National University of Sciences & Technology
Academic staff of Quaid-i-Azam University
Academic staff of King Fahd University of Petroleum and Minerals
University of Texas at Austin faculty
Recipients of Sitara-i-Imtiaz